Jack William McAllister (born c. 1994), known professionally as Willaris. K, is an Australian electronic music producer. McAllister signed to the label Astralwerks in 2019, and has released 3 EP’s (Alchemy, Lustre, Full Noise) and remixes for artists such as Flume. He has also performed at festivals including Beyond The Valley, Lost Paradise, Lollapalooza, Forbidden Fruit, Pitch Festival and Strawberry Fields.

Career

2020–present: Lustre and Full Noise
McAllister released his second EP Lustre on 3 April 2020.

McAllister's third EP Full Noise was released on 17 July.

Discography

Extended plays

Singles

Remixes

Music videos

Notes

Tours

References

Australian musicians
Living people
Australian electronic musicians
Australian house musicians
Australian DJs
Electronic dance music DJs
1994 births